Radio Days is a 1987 film directed by Woody Allen.

Radio Days may also refer to:

 "Radio Days" (Full House)
 "Radio Days" (Roseanne)
 Radio Dayz, 2008 South Korean film